Morten Hans von Krogh (27 May 1948 – 25 September 2015) was a Norwegian fencer and actor.

He won five Norwegian championships between 1969 and 1986, and competed in the individual épée event at the 1972 Summer Olympics. He was one of the spearheads of the Norwegian 1980 Olympic boycott.

Krogh later served as rector of the Norwegian National Academy of Theatre. He died in September 2015.

References

External links
 

1948 births
2015 deaths
Sportspeople from Oslo
Norwegian male épée fencers
Olympic fencers of Norway
Fencers at the 1972 Summer Olympics
Norwegian male stage actors
Rectors of universities and colleges in Norway
Von Krogh family
20th-century Norwegian people